Janne Saksela (born 14 March 1993) is a retired Finnish footballer

Club career
On 3 August 2019 he returned to Finland, signing a 1.5-year contract with Ilves. He suffered an ACL rupture just 8 days later in his second game for Ilves and is expected to miss several months. He announced his retirement from professional football in october 2022

International career
He was a member of the Finland national football team from 2016.

Career statistics

References

External links
 
 
 

1993 births
Living people
Finnish footballers
Finland international footballers
PK-35 Vantaa (men) players
JJK Jyväskylä players
Helsingin Jalkapalloklubi players
Rovaniemen Palloseura players
Sparta Rotterdam players
FC Ilves players
Veikkausliiga players
Ykkönen players
Kakkonen players
Eredivisie players
Eerste Divisie players
Tweede Divisie players
Expatriate footballers in the Netherlands
Finnish expatriates in the Netherlands
Association football defenders
Association football midfielders
Sportspeople from Vantaa